was an annual music awards on the produced by Nippon Cultural Broadcasting.

Hosts 
Iori Sato, Keiko Ochiai (1975)
Monta Mino (1976-1979)
Shigeru Kajiwara (1980-1991)
Yasuo Takeuchi (1992-1994)

Gold Prize winners 
Hiroshi Itsuki, Saori Minami (1971)
Megumi Asaoka, Masako Mori (1972)
Aki Yashiro, Agnes Chan (1973)
Mineko Nishikawa (1974)
Hiromi Iwasaki, Takashi Hosokawa (1975)
Kentaro Shimizu, Mizue Takada (1977)
Mako Ishino (1978)
Mariya Takeuchi (1979)
Toshihiko Tahara, Seiko Matsuda (1980)
Masahiko Kondō (1981)
Shibugakitai, Kyōko Koizumi (1982)
Kōji Kikkawa, Yukiko Okada (1984)
Minako Honda (1985)
Shonentai (1986)
Noriko Sakai, Risa Tachibana (1987)
Eriko Tamura (1989)
Mi-Ke, Michiyo Nakajima (1991)

Silver Prize winners 
Junko Sakurada, Momoe Yamaguchi, Mari Natsuki (1973)
Teresa Teng (1974)
Hiromi Ōta, Nana Okada (1975)
Pink Lady (1976)
Yū Hayami, Iyo Matsumoto, Chiemi Hori (1982)
Itsumi Osawa, Maiko Itō (1983)
Yōko Oginome (1984)
Miyuki Imori, Yōko Ishino (1985)
BaBe, Hikari Ishida, Fuyumi Sakamoto (1987)
Naomi Hosokawa (1989)
Noriko Katō (1992)

Bronze Prize winners 
Eiko Segawa (1970)
Goro Noguchi (1971)
Naoko Ken (1972)
Mayumi Asaka (1973)
Jun Fubuki, Yūko Asano (1974)
Yoshimi Ashikawa (1976)
Mayo Kawasaki (1977)
Southern All Stars, Lazy (1978)
Hiroko Mita (1982)
Yoko Minamino, Yui Asaka (1985)
Anna Makino (1987)
Kaori Kozai (1988)
In 1988, all 20 prize winners were given the Bronze Award because the awards ceremony was cancelled due to the deteriorating health of Emperor Shōwa.

Venues 
1968-1970s, 1990s-1994: Koseinenkin Hall
1970s-1980s: Nippon Budokan

See also 
 Festival della canzone italiana

References 
 音楽・芸能賞事典 Nichigai Associates 
 音楽・芸能賞事典 Nichigai Associates 1990/95 

Japanese music awards
Awards established in 1968
Awards disestablished in 1994
1968 establishments in Japan